Ethmia chemsaki is a moth in the family Depressariidae.

References

Moths described in 1959
chemsaki